Liang Lanbi (梁蘭璧;  300–311) was an empress during the Jin dynasty (266–420). Her husband was the ill-fated Sima Chi.

Very little is known about her, and she was not even listed in the biographies of the empresses in the Book of Jin, the official history of the dynasty. She had married Sima Chi long before he became emperor (most probably during his tenure as Prince of Yuzhang, although the date is not known). When he was crown prince, she carried the title of crown princess. When he became emperor on 11 January 307, she was created empress. Nothing further is known about her, including her fate when both she and her husband were captured by Han Zhao forces in 311. However, it appeared that at least by later that year, when the Han Zhao emperor Liu Cong created him the Duke of Kuaiji, she had either died or had been taken elsewhere, for Liu Cong gave a concubine of his, Consort Liu, to be the former Jin emperor's duchess.

Qing dynasty scholar Xue Fucheng said Empress Liang committed suicide in defence of her virtue.

Notes 

|- style="text-align: center;"

|-

|-

Jin dynasty (266–420) empresses
3rd-century births
4th-century deaths
3rd-century Chinese women
4th-century Chinese women
3rd-century Chinese people
4th-century Chinese people